Hewitt is a city in McLennan County, Texas, United States. The population was 16,026 at the 2020 census, making it the second largest city in the county. It is part of the Waco Metropolitan Statistical Area.

History 
The community of Hewitt was established following the donation of land by John A. Warren, the town's first businessman, in the 1880s. During the following decades, the community flourished on farming and agriculture during the days when "cotton was king". Hewitt grew slowly but steadily, incorporating as a city in 1960, and the population skyrocketed in the 1970s. The steady upward growth that continued for more than a century gave way to a 700-percent population boom. In 1890, Hewitt had 60 residents; the town has approximately 13,500 residents as of the 2010 census. In 2015, Hewitt was rated the 20th-best place to live in the United States by MSN Money.

Geography

Hewitt is located at  (31.453789, –97.195023).

The city is landlocked by the cities of Robinson and Waco (including its extraterritorial jurisdiction).

Demographics

As of the 2020 United States census, there were 16,026 people, 5,167 households, and 3,842 families residing in the city.

As of the census of 2000, 11,085 people, 3,931 households, and 3,223 families resided in the city. The population density was 1,608.0 people per square mile (621.2/km). The 4,018 housing units averaged 582.9 per square mile (225.2/km). The racial makeup of the city was 84.08% White, 7.70% African American, 0.42% Native American, 2.35% Asian, 0.06% Pacific Islander, 4.02% from other races, and 1.37% from two or more races. Hispanics or Latinos of any race were 9.28% of the population.

Of the 3,931 households, 45.6% had children under the age of 18 living with them, 68.3% were married couples living together, 10.9% had a female householder with no husband present, and 18.0% were not families. About 14.2% of all households were made up of individuals, and 3.3% had someone living alone who was 65 years of age or older. The average household size was 2.82 and the average family size was 3.12.

In the city, the population was distributed as 29.9% under the age of 18, 7.6% from 18 to 24, 33.0% from 25 to 44, 22.8% from 45 to 64, and 6.7% who were 65 years of age or older. The median age was 33 years. For every 100 females, there were 94.9 males. For every 100 females age 18 and over, there were 91.2 males.

The median income for a household in the city was $55,469, and for a family was $59,409. Males had a median income of $38,560 versus $24,659 for females. The per capita income for the city was $22,263. About 2.2% of families and 2.9% of the population were below the poverty line, including 3.1% of those under age 18 and 4.0% of those age 65 or over.

Hewitt was ranked number 44 on Money magazine's 2007 Top 100 places to live.

Education
The city of Hewitt is served by the Midway Independent School District. There are three elementary schools, half of the district's total, and one of its two middle schools in the city.

Culture
Hewitt was the birthplace of the late U.S. Senator Tom Connally of Texas.

In 1994, Willie Nelson was arrested for marijuana possession in the city.

The city was named in the film Harold & Kumar Escape from Guantanamo Bay, including the fictional Hewitt Regional Airport.  The scenes that took place in Hewitt were actually filmed in a different location.

Climate
The climate in this area is characterized by hot, humid summers and generally mild to cool winters.  According to the Köppen climate classification, Hewitt has a humid subtropical climate, Cfa on climate maps.

References

External links
 
 Official city website
 Hewitt Chamber of Commerce
 ePodunk: Profile for Hewitt, Texas
 City-Data.com

Cities in McLennan County, Texas
Cities in Texas
Populated places established in 1883